The flag of Tanzania consists of a yellow-edged black diagonal band, divided diagonally from the lower hoist-side corner, with a green upper triangle and light blue lower triangle.  Adopted in 1964 to replace the individual flags of Tanganyika and Zanzibar, it has been the flag of the United Republic of Tanzania since the two states merged that year.  The design of the present flag incorporates the elements from the two former flags. It is one of a relatively small number of national flags incorporating a diagonal line, with other examples including the DR Congo, Namibia, Trinidad and Tobago and Brunei.

History
The United Kingdom – together with its dominion South Africa and fellow Allied power Belgium – occupied the majority of German East Africa in 1916 during the East African Campaign.  Three years later, the British were tasked with administering the Tanganyika Territory as a League of Nations mandate.  It was turned into a UN Trust Territory after World War II, when the LN dissolved in 1946 and the United Nations was formed.  In 1954, the Tanganyika African Association – which spoke out against British colonial rule – became the Tanganyika African National Union (TANU) under the leadership of Julius Nyerere and Oscar Kambona.  The aim of the political party was to attain independence for the territory; its flag was a tricolour consisting of three horizontal green, black and yellow bands.  Shortly before independence in 1961, elections were held in Tanganyika.  After the TANU won comprehensively, the British colonial leaders advised them to utilise the design of their party's flag as inspiration for a new national flag.  As a result, yellow stripes were added, and Tanganyika became independent on 9 December 1961.

The Sultanate of Zanzibar – which was a British protectorate until 1963 – used a red flag during its reign over the island.  The last sultan was overthrown in the Zanzibar Revolution on 12 January 1964, and the Afro-Shirazi Party – the ruling political party of the newly formed People's Republic of Zanzibar – adopted a national flag the next month that was inspired by its own party flag.  This consisted of a tricolour with three horizontal blue, black and green bands.

In April 1964, both Tanganyika and Zanzibar united in order to form a single country – the United Republic of Tanzania.  Consequently, the flag designs of the two states were amalgamated to establish a new national flag.  The green and black colours from the flag of Tanganyika were retained along with the blue from Zanzibar's flag, with a diagonal design used "for distinctiveness".  This combined design was adopted on 30 June 1964.  It was featured on the first set of stamps issued by the newly unified country.

Design

Symbolism
The colors and symbols of the flag carry cultural, political, and regional meanings.  The green alludes to the natural vegetation and "rich agricultural resources" of the country, while black represents the Swahili people who are native to Tanzania.  The blue epitomizes the Indian Ocean, as well as the nation's numerous lakes and rivers.  The thin stripes stand for Tanzania's mineral wealth, derived from the "rich deposits" in the land.  While Whitney Smith in the Encyclopædia Britannica and Dorling Kindersley's Complete Flags of the World describe the fimbriations as yellow, other sources – such as The World Factbook and Simon Clarke in the journal Azania: Archaeological Research in Africa – contend that it is actually gold.

Historical flags

See also
Flag of Zanzibar

References

External links

Country Profile, at The Tanzania National Website (Tanzania Government). Accessed 16 February 2006.

Flags introduced in 1964
Flags of Africa
Flag
National flags